The 2007 New York Mets season was the 46th regular season for the Mets.  The Mets were defending their first divisional championship since 1988.  While the Atlanta Braves were counted as possible competition, the Philadelphia Phillies were predicted as the front-runners, albeit by their own star shortstop, Jimmy Rollins. Ultimately, Rollins' prediction rang true, as the Phillies won the NL East Division title on the last day of the regular season.  With a seven-game division lead on September 12, the Mets suffered a historic collapse by losing 12 of their last 17 games and missing the postseason.

2006 Offseason
The Mets' high hopes for the 2006 postseason were thwarted on September 29, 2006, when it was announced that ace Pedro Martínez was done for the remainder of the year due to a left calf muscle strain. Later it was announced that Pedro would have to undergo rotator cuff surgery and would miss a sizable portion of the 2007 season. On October 3, the day before his game 1 NLDS start, it was announced that Orlando Hernández tweaked his right calf muscle while jogging in the outfield at Shea. He wouldn't be able to pitch again until the 2007 season.

Coming into the 2006 offseason, it was clear that the team's biggest need was pitching.  Pedro would return, but in what condition?  El-Duque was a question mark with his age and veteran Steve Trachsel guaranteed his departure with a Game 3 NLCS meltdown. Omar Minaya, the Mets' General Manager, made it clear that his first order of business concerned their in-house free agents including: Tom Glavine, Orlando Hernández, and Chad Bradford. The Mets also went hard after Japanese SP Daisuke Matsuzaka.  On November 14, the Boston Red Sox outbid the Mets $51.1 million to ~$39 million for negotiating rights to Matsuzaka. Also on this day, the Mets tendered contracts to Orlando Hernández and 37-year-old José Valentín. Two days later 37-year-old Damion Easley was acquired as a fourth outfielder and to occasionally spell Valentín at second base.  40-year-old slugger Moisés Alou was signed to replace Cliff Floyd in left field.  On December 1, with the hopes of winning his 300th game, Tom Glavine signed a single year contract.  The Mets also had their eyes on free agent SP Barry Zito who eventually ended up with the San Francisco Giants after signing the largest contract ever for a pitcher at the time in MLB history.  Former All-Star pitcher Chan-ho Park was also signed but lasted only one poor start before being released.

The biggest changes took place in the bullpen.  The Mets lost Chad Bradford, Roberto Hernández, and Darren Oliver to free agency.  The Mets also initiated a series of questionable moves where young bullpen arms were traded away. Heath Bell and Royce Ring were packaged in a deal to San Diego for outfielder Ben Johnson and reliever Jon Adkins.  Hard throwers Henry Owens and Matt Lindstrom were traded to the Florida Marlins for lefties Jason Vargas and Adam Bostick.  Serviceable starter Brian Bannister was traded to the Kansas City Royals for the 23-year-old flame thrower Ambiorix Burgos.  The worst news came with the loss of pitchers Duaner Sánchez and Juan Padilla. Sánchez, who had recovered from a mid-2006 taxicab accident and signed a new contract, was sidelined after reinjuring his shoulder during Spring training.  In addition, newly signed Guillermo Mota was suspended for the first 50 games of the regular season for steroid use.  The Mets were forced to rely on mainstays Billy Wagner, Aaron Heilman, and Pedro Feliciano in addition to new acquisitions: veteran reliever Scott Schoeneweis and veteran starter-turned-reliever Aaron Sele.  The remaining spots were populated by rookie Joe Smith and Ambiorix Burgos.

The 2007 Mets began the season much older and untested than the 2006 team.  The starting pitching wasn't improved.  Old veterans Tom Glavine and Orlando Hernández appeared at the top of the rotation followed by question marks: John Maine and Óliver Pérez.  It was unknown how healthy Glavine and Hernandez would be by the end of the season.  It was also unknown if Maine and Perez would continue to improve after their postseason successes and if they could handle the load of pitching a full season.  The fifth spot was given to rookie Mike Pelfrey.  The lineup also aged dramatically with the inclusion of Alou and Easley to a roster already containing Julio Franco, José Valentín, Carlos Delgado, and Paul Lo Duca.  The bullpen lost valuable arms in Chad Bradford, Darren Oliver, and Duaner Sánchez.  By the time it became apparent that Sanchez and Padilla would be unable to pitch, the Mets had already traded away Heath Bell and Henry Owens.  Both had the experience and ability to step in and contribute on a major league level.

Regular season
The season started similarly to 2006 for the Mets as they swept the season-opening series against the best defending champion St. Louis Cardinals and winning their first four games by a combined score of 31–3; in doing so, the Mets joined the 1978 Brewers as the only teams in major league history to win their first four games by a margin of at least 28 runs. Unlike 2006, the Braves stayed close throughout April and even held sole possession of first place at the end of the month.  Also unlike 2006, the Mets were led by an unlikely hero, John Maine, who was undefeated and named the National League Pitcher of the Month for April. David Wright hit only .244 with no home runs and six RBI in April but carried over a hitting streak from 2006 that reached a franchise record 26 games.

New York followed their strong April with an even stronger May. Jorge Sosa replaced Pelfrey in the starting rotation and compiled a 4–1 record for the month.  His 8–1 win on May 16 put the Mets in first place where they remained until the last week of the season. Wright led the offense in May with eight home runs and 22 RBI.  The Mets went 19–9 in May and finished the month with a -game lead despite starting second baseman José Valentín out for the entire month with an injury and starting outfielders Moisés Alou and Shawn Green missing time as well.

As the calendar turned to June, the Mets began slumping, losing six straight series against teams with winning records, the last four series part of a stretch of 18 straight games against 2006 playoff teams, facing the Tigers, Dodgers, Yankees, Twins, Athletics, and Cardinals, becoming the first team in MLB history to play six consecutive series against six different teams that made the playoffs the previous season. This stretch started poorly for the Mets, as they lost 9 out of 12 to the Tigers, Dodgers, Yankees, and Twins. However, they turned it around and won 5 out of 6 against the Athletics and Cardinals to finish this stretch. The Mets entered the All-Star break with 48 wins and 39 losses, with a slim lead over the second-place Atlanta Braves. The Mets acquired Luis Castillo and Jeff Conine before the playoff roster deadline of September 1 to fill holes that were created due to injuries. On July 12, 2007, Julio Franco was released by the Mets.

Shortstop José Reyes was mentioned at mid-season as a possible MVP. Pedro Martínez notched his 3,000th strikeout. Tom Glavine got his 300th win. The team went into Wrigley Field in August and took two of three from the NL Central's first place Cubs, then beat up on the NL West's first place Diamondbacks a week later.  Despite being swept by the second place Phillies in a four-game series in Philadelphia on August 27–30 (during which the Mets saw their six-game lead evaporate to two), the Mets won nine out of their next ten games, and everything was seemingly going the Mets' way.  On September 12, the Mets were 21 games over .500 with a record of 83–62.  Over the last three weeks of the baseball season, they won only five games.

Pedro Martínez returned to the Mets starting rotation in time for the September playoff deadline. As of September 17, the Mets were in first place in the NL East with an 83–66 record and a -game lead over the charging Phillies. They had lost four in a row, including a three-game sweep by the Phillies. Moisés Alou, as of September 17 had a 21-game hitting streak.

Down the stretch, the Mets played poorly including losing five out of six games with the fourth-place Washington Nationals.  They lost on September 28 to fall into second place for the first time in over four months but pulled back into a tie with Philadelphia on September 29.  On September 30, the Mets faced the Florida Marlins with hopes of winning the NL East or at least forcing a one-game playoff. Tom Glavine surrendered 7 runs in the first inning as the Mets fell 8–1.  The Phillies capped their miraculous comeback with a 6–1 victory over the Washington Nationals to win the National League East.  The 2007 Mets collapse is one of the worst in baseball history, mirroring "the Phold" of 1964, where the Phillies lost a -game lead in the last twelve games.  The Mets, who had come back in 1969 against improbable odds to beat out the Cubs, now found themselves on the other side of the equation, coincidentally, against a team in the Phillies that in 1964 had pulled a similar collapse.

The 2007 Mets finished the season with a record of 88 wins and 74 losses. They placed second in the National League East, and third in the Wild Card standings.

Season standings

National League East

Record vs. opponents

Roster

Game log

|- align="center" bgcolor="bbffbb"
| 1 || April 1 || @ Cardinals || 6–1 || Glavine (1–0) || Carpenter (0–1) || || 45,429 || 1–0
|- align="center" bgcolor="bbffbb"
| 2 || April 3 || @ Cardinals || 4–1 || Hernández (1–0) || Wells (0–1) || Wagner (1) || 45,440 || 2–0
|- align="center" bgcolor="bbffbb"
| 3 || April 4 || @ Cardinals || 10–0 || Maine (1–0) || Looper (0–1) || || 45,423 || 3–0
|- align="center" bgcolor="bbffbb"
| 4 || April 6 || @ Braves || 11–1 || Pérez (1–0) || Redman (0–1) || || 51,014 || 4–0
|- align="center" bgcolor="ffbbbb"
| 5 || April 7 || @ Braves || 5–3 || Smoltz (1–0) || Glavine (1–1) || Wickman (2) || 43,156 || 4–1
|- align="center" bgcolor="ffbbbb"
| 6 || April 8 || @ Braves || 3–2 || Soriano (1–0) || Heilman (0–1) || Wickman (3) || 24,832 || 4–2
|- align="center" bgcolor="bbffbb"
| 7 || April 9 || Phillies || 11–5 || Feliciano (1–0) || Geary (0–1) || || 56,227 || 5–2
|- align="center" bgcolor="ffbbbb"
| 8 || April 11 || Phillies || 5–2 || Eaton (1–1) || Pérez (1–1) || Gordon (1) || 41,927 || 5–3
|- align="center" bgcolor="bbffbb"
| 9 || April 12 || Phillies || 5–3 || Glavine (2–1) || Moyer (1–1) || Wagner (2) || 33,355 || 6–3
|- align="center" bgcolor="bbffbb"
| 10 || April 13 || Nationals || 3–2 || Heilman (1–1) || Wagner (0–1) || Wagner (3) || 47,311 || 7–3
|- align="center" bgcolor="ffbbbb"
| 11 || April 14 || Nationals || 6–2 || Hill (1–1) || Hernández (1–1) || || 53,560 || 7–4
|- align="center" bgcolor="bbbbbb"
| – || April 15 || Nationals || colspan=5|Postponed (rain)  || 7–4
|- align="center" bgcolor="bbbbbb"
| – || April 16 || @ Phillies || colspan=5|Postponed (rain)  || 7–4
|- align="center" bgcolor="bbffbb"
| 12 || April 17 || @ Phillies || 8–1 || Glavine (3–1) || García (0–1) || || 27,058 || 8–4
|- align="center" bgcolor="bbffbb"
| 13 || April 18 || @ Marlins || 9–2 || Maine (2–0) || Willis (3–1) || || 17,219 || 9–4
|- align="center" bgcolor="bbffbb"
| 14 || April 19 || @ Marlins || 11–3 || Hernández (2–1) || VandenHurk (0–1) || || 11,815 || 10–4
|- align="center" bgcolor="ffbbbb"
| 15 || April 20 || Braves || 7–3 || Hudson (3–0) || Pelfrey (0–1) || || 47,547 || 10–5
|- align="center" bgcolor="bbffbb"
| 16 || April 21 || Braves || 7–2 || Pérez (2–1) || James (2–2) || || 55,143 || 11–5
|- align="center" bgcolor="ffbbbb"
| 17 || April 22 || Braves || 9–6 || Yates (1–0) || Heilman (1–2) || Wickman (6) || 55,671 || 11–6
|- align="center" bgcolor="bbffbb"
| 18 || April 23 || Rockies || 6–1 || Maine (3–0) || Buchholz (1–1) || || 32,154 || 12–6
|- align="center" bgcolor="bbffbb"
| 19 || April 24 || Rockies || 2–1   || Smith (1–0) || Speier (0–1) || || 38,500 || 13–6
|- align="center" bgcolor="ffbbbb"
| 20 || April 25 || Rockies || 11–5 || Fogg (1–1) || Pelfrey (0–2) || || 33,522 || 13–7
|- align="center" bgcolor="ffbbbb"
| 21 || April 27 || @ Nationals || 4–3 ||Chico (2–2) ||Pérez (2–2) ||Cordero (3) || 21,662 || 13–8
|- align="center" bgcolor="bbffbb"
| 22 || April 28 || @ Nationals || 6–2   || Sele (1–0) || Rivera (0–1) || || 29,292 || 14–8
|- align="center" bgcolor="bbffbb"
| 23 || April 29 || @ Nationals || 1–0 || Maine (4–0) || Bergmann (0–2) || Wagner (4) || 27,361 || 15–8
|- align="center" bgcolor="ffbbbb"
| 24 || April 30 || Marlins || 9–6 || Olsen (3–1) || Park (0–1) || Owens (2) || 39,383 || 15–9

|- align="center" bgcolor="ffbbbb"
| 25 || May 1 || Marlins || 5–2 || Nolasco (1–0) || Pelfrey (0–3) || Owens (3) || 48,458 || 15–10
|- align="center" bgcolor="bbffbb"
| 26 || May 2 || Marlins || 6–3 || Pérez (3–2) || Sánchez (2–1) || Wagner (5) || 25,236 || 16–10
|- align="center" bgcolor="bbffbb"
| 27 || May 3 || @ D-backs || 9–4 || Heilman (2–2) || Valverde (0–2) || || 19,710 || 17–10
|- align="center" bgcolor="bbffbb"
| 28 || May 4 || @ D-backs || 5–3 || Maine (5–0) || Johnson (0–2) || Wagner (6) || 26,268 || 18–10
|- align="center" bgcolor="bbffbb"
| 29 || May 5 || @ D-backs || 6–2 || Sosa (1–0) || Webb (2–2) || || 30,339 || 19–10
|- align="center" bgcolor="ffbbbb"
| 30 || May 6 || @ D-backs || 3–1 || Hernández (3–1) || Pelfrey (0–4) || Valverde (11) || 35,363 || 19–11
|- align="center" bgcolor="ffbbbb"
| 31 || May 7 || @ Giants || 9–4 || Zito (3–3) || Pérez (3–3) || || 37,365 || 19–12
|- align="center" bgcolor="bbffbb"
| 32 || May 8 || @ Giants || 4–1 || Glavine (4–1) || Cain (1–3) || Wagner (7) || 39,455 || 20–12
|- align="center" bgcolor="bbffbb"
| 33 || May 9 || @ Giants || 5–3 || Heilman (3–2) || Benítez (0–1) || Wagner (8) || 41,832 || 21–12
|- align="center" bgcolor="bbffbb"
| 34 || May 11 || Brewers || 5–4 || Sosa (2–0) || Suppan (5–3) || Wagner (9) || 40,126 || 22–12
|- align="center" bgcolor="ffbbbb"
| 35 || May 12 || Brewers || 12–3 || Sheets (3–2) || Pelfrey (0–5) || ||| 50,193 || 22–13
|- align="center" bgcolor="bbffbb"
| 36 || May 13 || Brewers || 9–1 || Pérez (4–3) || Capuano (5–1) ||  || 51,427 || 23–13
|- align="center" bgcolor="bbffbb"
| 37 || May 14 || Cubs || 5–4 || Heilman (4–2) || Wuertz (0–2) || || 34,033 || 24–13
|- align="center" bgcolor="ffbbbb"
| 38 || May 15 || Cubs || 10–1 || Zambrano (4–3) || Maine (5–1) || || 37,487 || 24–14
|- align="center" bgcolor="bbffbb"
| 39 || May 16 || Cubs || 8–1 || Sosa (3–0) || Hill (4–3) || || 37,483 || 25–14
|- align="center" bgcolor="bbffbb"
| 40 || May 17 || Cubs || 6–5 || Burgos (1–0) || Dempster (1–2) || || 42,667 || 26–14
|- align="center" bgcolor="bbffbb"
| 41 || May 18 || Yankees || 3–2 || Pérez (5–3) || Pettitte (2–3) || Wagner (10) || 56,337 || 27–14
|- align="center" bgcolor="bbffbb"
| 42 || May 19 || Yankees || 10–7 || Glavine (5–1) || Rasner (1–3) || || 56,137 || 28–14
|- align="center" bgcolor="ffbbbb"
| 43 || May 20 || Yankees || 6–2 || Clippard (1–0) || Maine (5–2) || || 56,438 || 28–15
|- align="center" bgcolor="ffbbbb"
| 44 || May 22 || @ Braves || 8–1 || Davies (2–2) || Sosa (3–1) || || 32,587 || 28–16
|- align="center" bgcolor="bbffbb"
| 45 || May 23 || @ Braves || 3–0 || Pérez (6–3) || James (4–4) || Wagner (11) || 30,489 || 29–16
|- align="center" bgcolor="ffbbbb"
| 46 || May 24 || @ Braves || 2–1 || Smoltz (7–2) || Glavine (5–2) || Wickman (7) || 36,660 || 29–17
|- align="center" bgcolor="bbffbb"
| 47 || May 25 || @ Marlins || 6–2 || Heilman (5–2) || Pinto (0–2) || || 24,278 || 30–17
|- align="center" bgcolor="bbffbb"
| 48 || May 26 || @ Marlins || 7–2 || Maine (6–2) || Obermueller (1–3) || || 34,505 || 31–17
|- align="center" bgcolor="bbffbb"
| 49 || May 27 || @ Marlins || 6–4 || Sosa (4–1) || Olsen (4–4) || Wagner (12) || 23,622 || 32–17
|- align="center" bgcolor="bbffbb"
| 50 || May 29 || Giants || 5–4   || Smith (2–0) || Benítez  (0–3) || || 47,940 || 33–17
|- align="center" bgcolor="ffbbbb"
| 51 || May 30 || Giants || 3–0 || Zito (5–5) || Glavine (5–3) || Hennessey (2) || 41,395 || 33–18
|- align="center" bgcolor="bbffbb"
| 52 || May 31 || Giants || 4–2 || Hernández (3–1) || Cain (2–5) || Wagner (13) || 44,228 || 34–18

|- align="center" bgcolor="ffbbbb"
| 53 || June 1 || D-backs || 5–1 || Webb (5–3) || Maine (6–3) || || 40,230 || 34–19
|- align="center" bgcolor="bbffbb"
| 54 || June 2 || D-backs || 7–1 || Sosa (5–1) || Hernández (5–3) || || 45,219 || 35–19
|- align="center" bgcolor="ffbbbb"
| 55 || June 3 || D-backs || 4–1 || Davis (4–6) || Pérez (6–4) || Valverde (20) || 53,012 || 35–20
|- align="center" bgcolor="ffbbbb"
| 56 || June 5 || Phillies || 4–2   || Geary (1–1) || Felicinano (1–1) || Alfonseca (2) || 43,078 || 35–21
|- align="center" bgcolor="ffbbbb"
| 57 || June 6 || Phillies || 4–2 || Eaton (6–4) || Heilman (5–3) || Alfonseca (3) || 42,696 || 35–22
|- align="center" bgcolor="ffbbbb"
| 58 || June 7 || Phillies || 6–3   || Zagurski (1–0) || Schoeneweis (0–1) || Alfonseca (4) || 43,398 || 35–23
|- align="center" bgcolor="bbffbb"
| 59 || June 8 || @ Tigers || 3–0 || Sosa (6–1) || Durbin (5–2) || Wagner (14) || 42,007 || 36–23
|- align="center" bgcolor="ffbbbb"
| 60 || June 9 || @ Tigers || 8–7 || Bonderman (6–0) || Pérez (6–5) || Jones (16) || 42,364 || 36–24
|- align="center" bgcolor="ffbbbb"
| 61 || June 10 || @ Tigers || 15–7 || Miller (2–0) || Glavine (5–4) || || 40,914 || 36–25
|- align="center" bgcolor="ffbbbb"
| 62 || June 11 || @ Dodgers || 5–3 || Wolf (8–4) || Hernández (3–2) || Saito (17) || 40,467 || 36–26
|- align="center" bgcolor="ffbbbb" 
| 63 || June 12 || @ Dodgers || 4–1 || Kuo (1–1) || Maine (6–4) || Saito (18) || 42,438 || 36–27
|- align="center" bgcolor="ffbbbb" 
| 64 || June 13 || @ Dodgers || 9–1 || Penny (8–1) || Sosa (6–2) || || 46,894 || 36–28
|- align="center" bgcolor="bbffbb"
| 65 || June 15 || @ Yankees || 2–0 || Pérez (7–5) || Clemens (1–1) || Wagner (15) || 55,159 || 37–28
|- align="center" bgcolor="ffbbbb" 
| 66 || June 16 || @ Yankees || 11–7 || Vizcaíno (3–1) || Glavine (5–5) || || 55,064 || 37–29
|- align="center" bgcolor="ffbbbb" 
| 67 || June 17 || @ Yankees || 8–2 || Wang (5–4) || Hernández (3–3) || ||55,060 || 37–30
|- align="center" bgcolor="bbffbb"
| 68 || June 18 || Twins || 8–1 || Maine (7–4) || Silva (4–8) || || 37,319 || 38–30
|- align="center" bgcolor="ffbbbb" 
| 69 || June 19 || Twins || 9–0 || Santana (7–6) || Sosa (6–3) || || 40,935 || 38–31
|- align="center" bgcolor="ffbbbb" 
| 70 || June 20 || Twins || 6–2 || Baker (2–2) || Pérez (7–6) || || 44,517 || 38–32
|- align="center" bgcolor="bbffbb"
| 71 || June 22 || Athletics || 9–1 || Glavine (6–5) || DiNardo (2–4) || || 43,029 || 39–32
|- align="center" bgcolor="bbffbb"
| 72 || June 23 || Athletics || 1–0 || Wagner (1–0) || Casilla (2–1) || || 52,920 || 40–32
|- align="center" bgcolor="bbffbb"
| 73 || June 24 || Athletics || 10–2 || Maine (8–4) || Kennedy (2–5) || || 50,143 || 41–32
|- align="center" bgcolor="bbffbb"
| 74 || June 25 || Cardinals || 2–1   || Heilman (6–3) || Springer (3–1) || || 40,075 || 42–32
|- align="center" bgcolor="ffbbbb" 
| 75 || June 26 || Cardinals || 5–3   || Thompson (6–3) || Schoeneweis (0–2) || Flores (1) || 40,053 || 42–33
|- align="center" bgcolor="bbffbb"
| 76 || June 27 || Cardinals || 2–0   || Glavine (7–5) || Reyes (0–10) || || 40,948 || 43–33
|- align="center" bgcolor="bbbbbb"
| – || June 28 || Cardinals || colspan=5|Postponed (rain)  || 43–33
|- align="center" bgcolor="bbffbb"
| 77 || June 29 || @ Phillies || 6–5 || Hernández (4–3) || Durbin (0–1) || Wagner (16) || 35,849 || 44–33
|- align="center" bgcolor="bbffbb"
| 78 || June 29 || @ Phillies || 5–2 || Maine (9–4) || Hamels (9–4) || || 45,165 || 45–33
|- align="center" bgcolor="bbffbb"
| 79 || June 30 || @ Phillies || 8–3 || Sosa (7–3) || Happ (0–1) || Feliciano (1) || 45,003 || 46–33

|- align="center" bgcolor="ffbbbb" 
| 80 || July 1 || @ Phillies || 5–3 || Kendrick (2–0) || Pelfrey (0–6) || Alfonseca (6) || 45,289 || 46–34
|- align="center" bgcolor="ffbbbb" 
| 81 || July 2 || @ Rockies || 6–2 || Hirsh (4–7) || Glavine (7–6) || || 27,252 || 46–35
|- align="center" bgcolor="ffbbbb"
| 82 || July 3 || @ Rockies || 11–3 || Cook (5–5) || Vargas (0–1) || || 48,040 || 46–36
|- align="center" bgcolor="ffbbbb"
| 83 || July 4 || @ Rockies || 17–7 || Fogg (4–6) || Hernández (4–4) || || 48,123 || 46–37
|- align="center" bgcolor="bbffbb"
| 84 || July 5 || @ Astros || 6–2 || Maine (10–4) || Jennings (1–4) || || 35,430 || 47–37
|- align="center" bgcolor="ffbbbb"
| 85 || July 6 || @ Astros || 4–0 || Rodríguez (6–7) || Pelfrey (0–7) || || 38,812 || 47–38
|- align="center" bgcolor="bbffbb"
| 86 || July 7 || @ Astros || 5–3   || Sele (2–0) || Moehler (1–3) || Wagner (17) || 41,596 || 48–38
|- align="center" bgcolor="ffbbbb"
| 87 || July 8 || @ Astros || 8–3 || Oswalt (8–5) || Williams (0–1) || || 40,708 || 48–39
|- align="center" bgcolor="bbffbb"
| 88 || July 12 || Reds || 3–2 || Hernández (5–4) || Arroyo (3–10) || Wagner (18) || 48,282 || 49–39
|- align="center" bgcolor="ffbbbb"
| 89 || July 13 || Reds || 8–4 || Harang (10–2) || Maine (10–5) || ||  51,305 || 49–40
|- align="center" bgcolor="bbffbb"
| 90 || July 14 || Reds || 2–1 || Glavine (8–6) || Stanton (1–3) || Wagner (19) || 51,742 || 50–40
|- align="center" bgcolor="bbffbb"
| 91 || July 15 || Reds || 5–2 || Pérez (8–6) || Lohse (5–11) || Wagner (20) || 52,186 || 51–40
|- align="center" bgcolor="ffbbbb"
| 92 || July 16 || @ Padres || 5–1 || Wells (5–5) || Sosa (7–4) ||  || 35,802 || 51–41
|- align="center" bgcolor="bbffbb"
| 93 || July 17 || @ Padres || 7–0 || Hernández (6–4) || Peavy (9–4) || || 31,660 || 52–41
|- align="center" bgcolor="ffbbbb"
| 94 || July 18 || @ Padres || 5–4 || Linebrink (3–2) || Smith (2–1) || Hoffman (26) || 32,524 || 52–42
|- align="center" bgcolor="bbffbb"
| 95 || July 19 || @ Dodgers || 13–9 || Sele (3–0) || Lowe (8–9) || || 51,651 || 53–42
|- align="center" bgcolor="bbffbb"
| 96 || July 20 || @ Dodgers || 4–1 || Pérez (9–6) || Hernández (3–2) || Wagner (21) || 52,103 || 54–42
|- align="center" bgcolor="ffbbbb"
| 97 || July 21 || @ Dodgers || 8–6 || Penny (12–1) || Sosa (7–5) || Broxton (2) || 49,124 || 54–43
|- align="center" bgcolor="bbffbb"
| 98 || July 22 || @ Dodgers || 5–4   || Feliciano (2–1) || Houlton (0–1) || Wagner (22) || 49,092 || 55–43
|- align="center" bgcolor="bbffbb"
| 99 || July 24 || Pirates || 8–4 || Maine (11–5) || Snell (7–8) || || 49,122 || 56–43
|- align="center" bgcolor="bbffbb"
| 100 || July 25 || Pirates || 6–3 || Glavine (9–6) || Gorzelanny (9–6) || Wagner (23) || 44,906 || 57–43
|- align="center" bgcolor="ffbbbb"
| 101 || July 26 || Pirates || 8–4 || Maholm (7–12) || Pérez (9–7) || || 52,150 || 57–44
|- align="center" bgcolor="ffbbbb"
| 102 || July 27 || Nationals || 6–2 || Bacsik (4–6) || Sosa (7–6) || || 51,179 || 57–45
|- align="center" bgcolor="bbffbb"
| 103 || July 28 || Nationals || 3–1 || Hernández (7–4) || Rivera (4–3) || Wagner (24) || 51,947 || 58–45
|- align="center" bgcolor="ffbbbb"
| 104 || July 28 || Nationals || 6–5 || Rauch (7–2) || Feliciano (2–2) || Cordero (21) || 46,265 || 58–46
|- align="center" bgcolor="bbffbb"
| 105 || July 29 || Nationals || 5–0   || Maine (12–5) || Traber (2–2) || || 47,264 || 59–46
|- align="center" bgcolor="ffbbbb"
| 106 || July 31 || @ Brewers || 4–2  || Bush (9–8) || Sele (3–1) || || 41,790 || 59–47

|- align="center" bgcolor="bbffbb"
| 107 || August 1 || @ Brewers || 8–5 || Pérez (10–7) || Vargas (9–3) || Wagner (25) || 42,058 || 60–47
|- align="center" bgcolor="bbffbb"
| 108 || August 2 || @ Brewers || 12–4 || Lawrence (1–0) || Capuano (5–8) || || 41,704 || 61–47
|- align="center" bgcolor="bbffbb"
| 109 || August 3 || @ Cubs || 6–2 || Mota (1–0) || Dempster (2–4) || || 41,512 || 62–47
|- align="center" bgcolor="ffbbbb"
| 110 || August 4 || @ Cubs || 6–2 || Lilly (12–5) || Maine (12–6) || || 41,412 || 62–48
|- align="center" bgcolor="bbffbb"
| 111 || August 5 || @ Cubs || 8–3 || Glavine (10–6) || Marquis (8–7) || || 41,599 || 63–48
|- align="center" bgcolor="ffbbbb"
| 112 || August 7 || Braves || 7–3 || Carlyle (7–3) || Pérez (10–8) || || 52,177 || 63–49
|- align="center" bgcolor="bbffbb"
| 113 || August 8 || Braves || 4–3 || Heilman (7–3) || Soriano (2–3) || Wagner (26) || 51,749 || 64–49
|- align="center" bgcolor="ffbbbb"
| 114 || August 9 || Braves || 7–6 || Hudson (13–5) || Maine (12–7) || Villarreal (1) || 52,425 || 64–50
|- align="center" bgcolor="ffbbbb"
| 115 || August 10 || Marlins || 4–3 || Lindstrom (2–3) || Wagner (1–1) || Gregg (25) || 48,516 || 64–51
|- align="center" bgcolor="ffbbbb"
| 116 || August 11 || Marlins || 7–5 || Miller (4–0) || Heilman (7–4) || Gregg (26) || 50,773 || 64–52
|- align="center" bgcolor="bbffbb"
| 117 || August 12 || Marlins || 10–4 || Sosa (8–6) || Gardner (3–3) || || 51,023 || 65–52
|- align="center" bgcolor="bbffbb"
| 118 || August 14 || @ Pirates || 5–4 || Sosa (9–6) || Torres (1–4) || Wagner (27) || 25,277 || 66–52
|- align="center" bgcolor="bbffbb"
| 119 || August 15 || @ Pirates || 10–8 || Maine (13–7) || Morris (7–8) || Wagner (28) || 18,241 || 67–52
|- align="center" bgcolor="ffbbbb"
| 120 || August 16 || @ Pirates || 10–7 || Marte (1–0) || Heilman (7–5) || Capps (11) || 36,447 || 67–53
|- align="center" bgcolor="bbffbb"
| 121 || August 17 || @ Nationals || 6–2 || Glavine (11–6) || Chico (5–7) || || 23,636 || 68–53
|- align="center" bgcolor="bbffbb"
| 122 || August 18 || @ Nationals || 7–4 || Pérez (11–8)|| Lannan (1–2) || Wagner (29) || 35,157 || 69–53
|- align="center" bgcolor="bbffbb"
| 123 || August 19 || @ Nationals || 8–2 || Hernández (8–4) || Rauch (8–4) || || 29,092 || 70–53
|- align="center" bgcolor="bbffbb"
| 124 || August 21 || Padres || 7–6 || Wagner (2–1) || Hoffman (2–4) || || 48,592 || 71–53
|- align="center" bgcolor="ffbbbb"
| 125 || August 22 || Padres || 7–5 || Peavy (14–5) || Lawrence (1–1) || Hoffman (32) || 50,060 || 71–54
|- align="center" bgcolor="ffbbbb"
| 126 || August 23 || Padres || 9–8   || Hoffman (3–4) || Heilman (7–6) || Bell (1) || 50,078 || 71–55
|- align="center" bgcolor="bbffbb"
| 127 || August 24 || Dodgers || 5–2 || Pérez (12–8) || Penny (14–4) || || 53,250 || 72–55
|- align="center" bgcolor="bbffbb"
| 128 || August 25 || Dodgers || 4–3 || Hernández (9–4) || Stults (1–2) || Heilman (1) || 52,655 || 73–55
|- align="center" bgcolor="ffbbbb"
| 129 || August 26 || Dodgers || 6–2 || Wells (6–8) || Maine (13–8) || || 49,234 || 73–56
|- align="center" bgcolor="ffbbbb"
| 130 || August 27 || @ Phillies || 9–2 || Durbin (6–3) || Lawrence (1–2) || || 38,165 || 73–57
|- align="center" bgcolor="ffbbbb"
| 131 || August 28 || @ Phillies || 4–2   || Myers (3–5) || Mota (1–1) || || 40,508 || 73–58
|- align="center" bgcolor="ffbbbb"
| 132 || August 29 || @ Phillies || 3–2 || Moyer (12–10) || Pérez (12–9) || Myers (13) || 43,150 || 73–59
|- align="center" bgcolor="ffbbbb"
| 133 || August 30 || @ Phillies || 11–10 || Gordon (2–2) || Wagner (2–2) || || 42,552 || 73–60
|- align="center" bgcolor="bbffbb"
| 134 || August 31 || @ Braves || 7–1 || Maine (14–8) || Hudson (15–7) || || 45,245 || 74–60

|- align="center" bgcolor="bbffbb"
| 135 || September 1 || @ Braves || 5–1 || Pelfrey (1–7) || James (9–10) || Feliciano (2) || 45,611 || 75–60
|- align="center" bgcolor="bbffbb"
| 136 || September 2 || @ Braves || 3–2 || Glavine (12–6) || Smoltz (12–7) || Wagner (30) || 46,242 || 76–60
|- align="center" bgcolor="bbffbb"
| 137 || September 3 || @ Reds || 10–4 || Martínez (1–0) || Harang (14–4) || || 29,290 || 77–60
|- align="center" bgcolor="bbffbb"
| 138 || September 4 || @ Reds || 11–7 || Pérez (13–9) || Bray (3–2) || || 20,655 || 78–60
|- align="center" bgcolor="ffbbbb"
| 139 || September 5 || @ Reds || 7–0 || Shearn (2–0) || Maine (14–9) || || 15,704 || 78–61
|- align="center" bgcolor="bbffbb"
| 140 || September 7 || Astros || 11–3 || Pelfrey (2–7) || Rodríguez (8–13) || || 51,113 || 79–61
|- align="center" bgcolor="bbffbb"
| 141 || September 8 || Astros || 3–1 || Glavine (13–6) || Williams (8–14) || Wagner (31) || 53,061 || 80–61
|- align="center" bgcolor="bbffbb"
| 142 || September 9 || Astros || 4–1 || Martínez (2–0) || Oswalt (14–7) || Wagner (32) || 51,847 || 81–61
|- align="center" bgcolor="bbffbb"
| 143 || September 10 || Braves || 3–2 || Pérez (14–9) || Hudson (15–8) || Wagner (33) || 48,557 || 82–61
|- align="center" bgcolor="ffbbbb"
| 144 || September 11 || Braves || 13–5 || Moylan (5–3) || Hernández (9–5) || || 48,732 || 82–62
|- align="center" bgcolor="bbffbb"
| 145 || September 12 || Braves || 4–3 || Mota (2–1) || Acosta (0–1) || Wagner (34) || 51,648 || 83–62
|- align="center" bgcolor="ffbbbb"
| 146 || September 14 || Phillies || 3–2   || Gordon (3–2) || Heilman (7–7) || Myers (16) || 53,730 || 83–63
|- align="center" bgcolor="ffbbbb"
| 147 || September 15 || Phillies || 5–3 || Alfonseca (5–1) || Sosa (9–7) || Myers (17) || 55,477 || 83–64
|- align="center" bgcolor="ffbbbb"
| 148 || September 16 || Phillies || 10–6 || Geary (3–2) || Mota (2–2) || || 52,779 || 83–65
|- align="center" bgcolor="ffbbbb"
| 149 || September 17 || @ Nationals || 12–4 || Albaladejo (1–0) || Sele (3–2) || || 18,678 || 83–66
|- align="center" bgcolor="ffbbbb"
| 150 || September 18 || @ Nationals || 9–8 || Colomé (5–1) || Maine (14–10) || Cordero (35) || 19,966 || 83–67
|- align="center" bgcolor="bbffbb"
| 151 || September 19 || @ Nationals || 8–4 || Pelfrey (3–7) || Chico (5–9) || || 20,558 || 84–67
|- align="center" bgcolor="ffbbbb"
| 152 || September 20 || @ Marlins || 8–7   || Tankersley (6–1) || Sosa (9–8) || || 15,132 || 84–68
|- align="center" bgcolor="bbffbb"
| 153 || September 21 || @ Marlins || 9–6 || Martínez (3–0) || Olsen (9–15) || Schoeneweis (1) || 25,666 || 85–68
|- align="center" bgcolor="bbffbb"
| 154 || September 22 || @ Marlins || 7–2 || Pérez (15–9) || Kim (9–8) || || 22,517 || 86–68
|- align="center" bgcolor="bbffbb"
| 155 || September 23 || @ Marlins || 7–6   || Smith (3–1) || García (0–1) || Schoeneweis (2) || 17,130 || 87–68
|- align="center" bgcolor="ffbbbb"
| 156 || September 24 || Nationals || 13–4 || Chico (6–9) || Pelfrey (3–8) || || 49,164 || 87–69
|- align="center" bgcolor="ffbbbb"
| 157 || September 25 || Nationals || 10–9 || Bergmann (6–5) || Glavine (13–7) || Rauch (4) || 49,244 || 87–70
|- align="center" bgcolor="ffbbbb"
| 158 || September 26 || Nationals || 9–6 || Hanrahan (5–3) || Smith (3–2) || Ayala (1) || 51,940 || 87–71
|- align="center" bgcolor="ffbbbb" 
| 159 || September 27 || Cardinals || 3–0 || Piñeiro (7–5) || Martínez (3–1) || Isringhausen (31) || 48,900 || 87–72
|- align="center" bgcolor="ffbbbb"
| 160 || September 28 || Marlins || 7–4 || Kim (10–8) || Pérez (15–10) || Gregg (32) || 55,298 || 87–73
|- align="center" bgcolor="bbffbb"
| 161 || September 29 || Marlins || 13–0 || Maine (15–10) || Seddon (0–2) || || 54,675 || 88–73
|- align="center" bgcolor="ffbbbb"
| 162 || September 30 || Marlins || 8–1 || Kensing (3–0) || Glavine (13–8) || || 54,453 || 88–74

|-
|

Player stats

Batting

Starters by position
Note: Pos = Position; G = Games played; AB = At bats; H = Hits; Avg. = Batting average; HR = Home runs; RBI = Runs batted in

Other batters
Note: G = Games played; AB = At bats; H = Hits; Avg. = Batting average; HR = Home runs; RBI = Runs batted in

Pitching

Starting pitchers
Note: G = Games pitched; IP = Innings pitched; W = Wins; L = Losses; ERA = Earned run average; SO = Strikeouts

Other pitchers
Note: G = Games pitched; IP = Innings pitched; W= Wins; L= Losses; ERA = Earned run average; SO = Strikeouts

Relief pitchers
Note: G = Games pitched; W= Wins; L= Losses; SV = Saves; ERA = Earned run average; SO = Strikeouts

Farm system

References

External links

Game Logs
1st Half: New York Mets Game Log on ESPN
2nd Half: New York Mets Game Log on ESPN
Batting Statistics: New York Mets Batting Stats on ESPN
Pitching Statistics: New York Mets Pitching Stats on ESPN

2007 New York Mets at Baseball Reference

New York Mets seasons
New York Mets season
New York Mets
2000s in Queens